Tilomisole (WY-18,251) is an experimental drug which acts as an immunomodulator and has been studied for the treatment of some forms of cancer.

It can also be seen to contain the arylacetic acid moiety that is endemic to many NSAIDs, e.g. ibufenac.

References

Immunology
Experimental cancer drugs